Marnix may refer to:

People
 the medieval and early modern house of Marnix, whose name originates from an eponymous hamlet of Nattages in today’s France, e.g.:
Philips of Marnix, Lord of Saint-Aldegonde (1540–1598), Flemish writer, statesman and adviser to William of Orange; probable author of the Dutch national anthem
 (1537–1567), Lord of Toulouse, Flemish noble, rebel leader who died in the Battle of Oosterweel

Marnix van den Broeke (born 1976), Dutch actor and stuntman
Marnix Gijsen (1899–1984), Flemish writer
Marnix Van Holsbeeck (born 1957), Belgian and American radiologist
Marnix Kappers (1943–2016), Dutch cabaret artist and actor
Marnix Kolder (born 1981), Dutch footballer
Marnix ten Kortenaar (born 1970), Dutch-Austrian speed skater
Marnix Lameire (born 1955), Belgian road cyclist
Marnix van Rij (born 1960), Dutch CDA politician
Marnix Smit (born 1975), Dutch footballer 
Marnix Verhegghe (born 1961), Belgian hammer thrower
Marnix Vervinck (born 1959), Belgian Olympic archer
Marnix Vincent (1936–2016), Belgian literary translator

Other uses
 Castle Marnix de Sainte-Aldegonde, the residence of the Marnix family in Bornem, Antwerp, Belgium
 HNLMS Marnix, a school ship of the Royal Netherlands navy
 Marnix Gymnasium, in Rotterdam, Netherlands
 5002 Marnix (1987 SS3), a main-belt asteroid

See also
Marnick Vermijl (born 1992), Belgian footballer
Marnicq Bervoets (born 1969), Belgian motocross racer

Dutch masculine given names